Singha Bahini Higher Secondary School is a public school situated at Myanglung-2, Terhathum in eastern Nepal. It is affiliated under Higher Secondary Education Board.

Faculty
It offers education in just 3 faculties i.e. Management, Arts and Education. It has a capacity of receiving more than 300 students in all shifts. The studies of +2 level is just in morning shifts and during day, the secondary level students are taught.

References

Schools in Nepal
Buildings and structures in Tehrathum District